Our Lady of Fatima Dominican Convent School is a girls' school, in Durban North (eThekwini Metropolitan Municipality) founded and supported by the Dominican sisters. The school caters for girls from Gr 0 through to Gr 12.

The school was founded in 1953 by the Newcastle Dominican sisters.

The school follows the IEB syllabus.

References

External links

Girls' schools in South Africa
Catholic schools in South Africa
1953 establishments in South Africa
Private schools in KwaZulu-Natal
EThekwini Metropolitan Municipality